"Ich bin der Doktor Eisenbart" ("I am the Doctor Eisenbart"), also called Eisenbart-Lied ("Eisenbart Song"), is a folk, student and drinking song written around 1800. It deals with the treatment methods of Johann Andreas Eisenbarth, who is depicted in the song as a quack. There are numerous variations, of which the earliest dateable publication of 1814 comes from the commercial book of the student association Germania from Göttingen. The first publication with melody appeared in 1840. In the 20th century the student song was transformed into a youth and children's song, the melody of which finally also formed the basis for the equally popular "Ein Mann, der sich Kolumbus nannt".

Creation 
The humorous song "Ich bin der Doktor Eisenbart" was probably written around 1800 by Göttingen students. A popular destination for them was nearby Hann. Münden, the home town and burial place of Johann Andreas Eisenbarth.

The song begins with the verse
Ich bin der Doktor Eisenbart,
widewidewitt, bum, bum,
kurier die Leut' auf meine Art,
widewidewitt, bum, bum.
Kann machen, dass die Blinden geh'n,
widewidewitt, juchheirassa,
und dass die Lahmen wieder seh'n,
widewidewitt, bum, bum.
I am the Doctor Eisenbart,
widewidewitt, boom, boom,
will cure the people in may way,
widewidewitt, boom, boom.
Can make it that the blind will walk,
widewidewitt, whoopee hurrah,
and that the lame can see again,
widewidewitt, boom, boom.
and has countless other verses that have been added to the original twelve over time.

Impact 
This song, in turn, inspired various authors to write novels to this day (1897; Josef Winckler, 1928; Otto Weddigen, 1909; Fritz Nölle, 1940; Hanns Kneifel, 2002), plays (for example Otto Falckenberg, 1908), operas (Alfred Böckmann and Pavel Haas) and Nico Dostal's operetta  (1952).

Dutch-language variation 

A Dutch-language variation of the song exists too, "Ik ben Doktor Grijzenbaard", removing all references to the real Eisenbart by calling him grijzenbaard (grey beard). In 1978 the Flemish comedy band  recorded a parody song of "Ik ben Doktor Grijzenbaard", titled "Ik ben Vader Grijzenbaard", which satirized the popularity of Vader Abraham's The Smurf Song, as well as The Muppets.

References

Further reading
 Arthur Kopp: Eisenbart im Leben und im Liede. Berlin 1900 Internet Archive.

External links

, Gerd Martens, Evi Arendt
13 verses, MIDI sound files, ingeb.org
Score, 5 verses, sound file, lieder-archiv.de
7 verses, history by Tobias Widmaier, February 2009, volksliedsammlung.de (in German)

German-language songs
Songs about physicians
German folk songs
German children's songs
Drinking songs
Commercium songs